We Were Strangers is a 1949 American adventure drama film directed by John Huston and starring Jennifer Jones and John Garfield. Set in 1933, the film concerns a group of revolutionaries attempting to overthrow the Cuban government of Gerardo Machado. The story is based loosely on an episode in Robert Sylvester's novel Rough Sketch and draws on historical events.

Plot
The story draws on events that occurred as part of the political violence that led to the overthrow of Cuban dictator Gerardo Machado y Morales in 1933. In 1932, a violent opposition group, the ABC (abecedarios), assassinated  the President of the Cuban Senate Clemente Vazquez Bello. They had constructed a tunnel to reach the Vazquez family crypt in Havana's Colón Cemetery and planted an explosive device there, anticipating that Machado would attend the funeral. The plan failed when the family decided to bury Vazquez elsewhere.

The film is about a group of revolutionaries who plot to bring down their corrupt government. The title, chosen by the distributor Columbia Pictures in place of Rough Sketch, identifies how they come together with no prior associations, sharing only their political principles. China Valdez (Jennifer Jones) is a bank clerk who has a brother who distributes anti-government flyers. She watches as a government operative guns him down on the steps of the University of Havana. She vows to kill his assassin, Ariete. At her brother's funeral, Tony Fenner (John Garfield), an American confederate of her brother, tells her to join his anti-government underground group instead of taking revenge on her own. When he learns that China's house borders a cemetery, he devises a scheme to dig a tunnel from China's house to the cemetery, assassinate a senior government official whose family plot is in that cemetery, and then detonate a bomb during the man's funeral, killing the government officials among the mourners. His disparate group of tunnelers includes a dockworker, a bicycle mechanic, and a graduate student. Much of the movie is devoted to the digging of the tunnel. The tunnelers struggle with the need to kill men who are less than entirely evil and to take the lives of innocent bystanders. Ramon goes mad thinking of these issues, wanders off and dies in a traffic accident. Ariete harasses China, jealous of her relationship with Fenner, who he has learned is actually Cuban by birth.

When the tunnel is ready, a prominent government minister is assassinated as planned. As a munitions expert prepares to set the bomb in place, they learn that the burial will not take place in the family tomb as expected. They make plans for Fenner, who by now is well known to Ariete, to leave Cuba. China will get the necessary funds from Fenner's account at her bank. Fenner rages about his failure, about the disgrace of returning to the people who funded his trip with small donations, fleeing as he had as a boy with his father. Only in supporting him at this point does China declare her love for him. China obtains the funds but sends a fellow employee because she is being tailed by one of Ariete's men. But Fenner, unwilling to leave without her, comes to China's house. The film climaxes with a violent shoot-out sequence, followed by the outbreak of revolution and popular celebration.

Cast
 Jennifer Jones as China Valdés
 John Garfield as Tony Fenner
 Pedro Armendáriz as Armando Ariete
 Gilbert Roland as Guillermo Montilla
 Ramon Novarro as Chief
 Wally Cassell as Miguel
 Tito Renaldo as Manolo Valdés
 David Bond as Ramón Sánchez
 José Pérez as Toto
 Morris Ankrum as Mr. Seymour, bank manager
 Roberta Haynes as Lolita Valdés

Production
Huston, recognizing the sensitive nature of the film's politics, formed an independent production company, Horizon Films, to finance the film. One critic has noted the film is "a barely disguised indictment of U.S. foreign policy" as well as a study of "the poetry of failure" typical of Huston's style. Huston cast Garfield partly because they shared the same political outlook.

Most of the film was shot at the Columbia Pictures studio in Los Angeles, with additional second unit work done in Havana. The second unit footage employed locally hired doubles for Jennifer Jones and other cast members.

Much of the script was written as filming progressed. According to Peter Viertel, "Huston was going through a lot of personal problems at the time, and he was unable to concentrate on the film" even though it presented serious challenges: "It was a very difficult story with an ending that wasn't exactly considered happy by Hollywood standards." The ending was repeatedly rewritten by a variety of writers, with the final version by Ben Hecht.

The supporting players include Mexican film star Pedro Armendáriz as the corrupt police chief, and former silent stars Gilbert Roland and Ramon Novarro as members of the resistance. John Huston makes a cameo appearance as a bank teller. Many of the film's outdoor scenes were shot against rear projections, which are quite noticeable, including views of Havana Harbor, Havana University, Morro Castle, and Colon Cemetery. The film, however, achieves an almost documentary-like feel with its stark black-and-white photography. The film was evidently unavailable for viewing until it was made available for domestic video sale in 2005, long after John Huston's other films became available.

During filming, Huston was asked to give Marilyn Monroe, then unknown, a screen test. As a result, he cast her in a small role in his next film, The Asphalt Jungle.

Reception
John Huston directed the film between two box office successes: The Treasure of Sierra Madre (1948) and The Asphalt Jungle (1950). We Were Strangers was released in April 1949 and received mixed reviews. In The New York Times, Bosley Crowther praised the physical and psychological realism of the conspirators, but he disliked Jennifer Jones' performance and missed a central romance: "the real emotional tinder which is scattered within this episode is never swept into a pyramid and touched off with a quick, explosive spark". Reviews in Time and Collier's were more positive, but The Hollywood Reporter denounced its politics: "a shameful handbook of Marxian dialectics ... the heaviest dish of Red theory ever served to an audience outside the Soviet". The film was withdrawn from theaters shortly after its release. The Communist Party's Daily Worker thought it was "capitalist propaganda."

American audiences were perplexed by it, its largely Hispanic cast did not resonate with white Americans, and its shocking presidential assassination theme may have offended some sensibilities.

Claimed effect on Lee Harvey Oswald
According to Priscilla Johnson McMillan's biography of Lee Harvey Oswald and his wife, Marina, Oswald was "greatly excited" while watching We Were Strangers on television in October 1963, just a few weeks before he assassinated President John F. Kennedy.

References

External links
 
 
 
 
 We Were Strangers at Rotten Tomatoes

1949 films
1940s adventure drama films
American adventure drama films
1940s English-language films
American black-and-white films
Films directed by John Huston
Films scored by George Antheil
Films shot in Cuba
Films set in Cuba
Films set in 1933
Films with screenplays by John Huston
Films produced by Sam Spiegel
1949 drama films
1940s American films